The 2019 edition of the Canadian Polaris Music Prize was presented on September 16, 2019. Haviah Mighty won the $50,000 dollar prize for her debut album 13th Floor, becoming the first Black woman and first hip hop artist to win the prize.

Gala 
The 2019 Polaris Music Prize Gala was hosted at The Carlu and had performances from nine of the ten shortlisted artists, with the exception of Jessie Reyez, who did not perform due to injury. The winner was announced by the previous year's winner, Jeremy Dutcher.

Performances

Shortlist
The shortlist was announced on July 16 with an afternoon special hosted by Raina Douris on the CBC Music radio network, which revealed one album per half hour and featured musical selections from and discussion with music critics about each album.

Longlist

The prize's preliminary 40-album longlist was announced on June 20.

Heritage Prize
Nominees for the Polaris Heritage Prize, a separate award to honour classic Canadian albums released before the creation of the Polaris Prize, were announced at the main Polaris gala, and the winners were announced on November 4. Unlike in prior years, when four shortlists were released for each of four distinct historical eras in Canadian music, in 2019 only a single shortlist, comprising 12 albums from across the entire history of Canadian music, was named; those 12 albums were submitted to a public vote, while the jury was able to select an album from outside the public shortlist.

References

External links
 Polaris Music Prize

2019 in Canadian music
2019 music awards
2019